The mixed 4 × 400 metres relay at the 2022 World Athletics Championships was held at the Hayward Field in Eugene on 15 July 2022.

Records
Before the competition records were as follows:

Qualification standard
The standard to qualify automatically for entry was to finish in the first 12 at 2021 World Relays, completed by 4 top lists' teams.

Schedule
The event schedule, in local time (UTC-7), was as follows:

Results

Heats 
The first three in each heat (Q) and the next two fastest (q) qualify for the final.

Final

References

4 x 400 metres relay
Relays at the World Athletics Championships